William Peacock may refer to:
William Peacock (businessman) (1790–1874), Australian businessman and politician
William Peacock (water polo) (1891–1948), British water polo player
William D. Peacock (1933–1998), Native Canadian newspaper publisher
William Peacock (biologist) (known as Jim Peacock, born 1937), Australian scientist
Billy Peacock, boxer, see United States national amateur boxing flyweight champions